The first election to the devolved Scottish Parliament, to fill 129 seats, took place on 6 May 1999. Following the election, the Labour Party and the Liberal Democrats formed the Scottish Executive, with Labour Member of the Scottish Parliament (MSP) Donald Dewar becoming First Minister.

The Scottish Parliament was created after a referendum on devolution took place on 11 September 1997 in which 74.3% of those who voted approved the idea. The Scotland Act (1998) was then passed by the UK Parliament which established the devolved Scottish Parliament and Scottish Executive. The parliament was elected using Mixed-member proportional representation, combining 73 (First-past-the-post) constituencies and proportional representation with the 73 constituencies being grouped together to make eight regions each electing seven additional members to make a total of 129. This meant that it would be unlikely for any party to gain a majority of seats in the new parliament and either minority or coalition Scottish Executives would have to be formed.

The first general election to the Scottish Parliament overall produced few surprises with the Labour Party still enjoying high popularity following their landslide victory in the 1997 UK general election as widely expected was the largest party winning 56 seats, mostly in their traditional Central Belt heartlands, which was nine seats short of an overall majority. Labour formed a coalition government with the Liberal Democrats, who won 17 seats.

The Scottish National Party (SNP) had done well in opinion polls running up to the election, gaining 40% in some approval ratings, but this level of support was not maintained. The SNP were the second largest party with 35 seats, which still represented their best performance since the October 1974 UK general election. The Conservative Party, still recovering from their wipeout in the 1997 UK general election across Scotland, failed to win a single constituency seat but did manage to win 18 seats through the Additional Member System.

The Scottish Socialist Party (SSP) and the Greens picked up unexpected additional member seats. Robin Harper became the first ever elected Green parliamentarian in the history of the United Kingdom. Dennis Canavan, who had failed to become an approved Labour candidate, won the Falkirk West constituency as an independent candidate.

Following the election the new parliament met in the General Assembly Hall of the Church of Scotland in Edinburgh for the first time on Wednesday 12 May 1999, although the actual devolution of powers from Westminster to the Scottish Parliament did not take place until midnight on Thursday 1 July 1999, almost two months later.

For a full list of MSPs elected, see 1st Scottish Parliament. For lists of constituencies and regions, see Scottish Parliament constituencies and electoral regions.

Results

|-
| style="background-color:white" colspan=15 | 
|-
! rowspan=2 colspan=2 | Party
! colspan=5 | Constituencies
! colspan=5 | Regional additional members
! colspan=5 | Total seats
|-
! Votes !! % !! ± !! Seats !! ± !! Votes !! % !! ± !! Seats !! ± !! Total !! ± !! %
|-

|-
|style="text-align:left"; colspan="2" | Valid votes || 2,342,488 || 99.7 || – || colspan="2"|   || 2,338,914 || 99.7 || – || colspan="5"|  
|-
|style="text-align:left"; colspan="2" | Spoilt votes || 7,839 || 0.3 || – || colspan="2"|   || 7,268 || 0.3 || – || colspan="5"|  
|-
!style="text-align:left"; colspan="2" | Total || 2,350,327 || 100 ||   || 73 || – || 2,346,182 || 100 ||   || 56 || – || 129 || – || 100
|-
|style="text-align:left"; colspan="2" | Electorate/turnout || 4,027,433 || 58.4 || – || colspan="2"|   || 4,027,433 || 58.3 || – || colspan="5"|  
|}

Constituency and regional summary

Central Scotland 

|-
! colspan=2 style="width: 200px"|Constituency
! style="width: 150px"|Elected member
! style="width: 300px"|Result

|-
! colspan="2" style="width: 150px"|Party
! Elected candidates
! style="width: 40px"|Seats
! style="width: 40px"|+/−
! style="width: 50px"|Votes
! style="width: 40px"|%
! style="width: 40px"|+/−%
|-

Glasgow 

|-
! colspan=2 style="width: 200px"|Constituency
! style="width: 150px"|Elected member
! style="width: 300px"|Result

|-
! colspan="2" style="width: 150px"|Party
! Elected candidates
! style="width: 40px"|Seats
! style="width: 40px"|+/−
! style="width: 50px"|Votes
! style="width: 40px"|%
! style="width: 40px"|+/−%
|-

Highlands and Islands 

|-
! colspan=2 style="width: 200px"|Constituency
! style="width: 150px"|Elected member
! style="width: 300px"|Result

|-
! colspan="2" style="width: 150px"|Party
! Elected candidates
! style="width: 40px"|Seats
! style="width: 40px"|+/−
! style="width: 50px"|Votes
! style="width: 40px"|%
! style="width: 40px"|+/−%
|-

Lothians 

|-
! colspan=2 style="width: 200px"|Constituency
! style="width: 150px"|Elected member
! style="width: 300px"|Result

|-
! colspan="2" style="width: 150px"|Party
! Elected candidates
! style="width: 40px"|Seats
! style="width: 40px"|+/−
! style="width: 50px"|Votes
! style="width: 40px"|%
! style="width: 40px"|+/−%
|-

Mid Scotland and Fife 

|-
! colspan=2 style="width: 200px"|Constituency
! style="width: 150px"|Elected member
! style="width: 300px"|Result

|-
! colspan="2" style="width: 150px"|Party
! Elected candidates
! style="width: 40px"|Seats
! style="width: 40px"|+/−
! style="width: 50px"|Votes
! style="width: 40px"|%
! style="width: 40px"|+/−%
|-

North East Scotland 

|-
! colspan=2 style="width: 200px"|Constituency
! style="width: 150px"|Elected member
! style="width: 300px"|Result

|-
! colspan="2" style="width: 150px"|Party
! Elected candidates
! style="width: 40px"|Seats
! style="width: 40px"|+/−
! style="width: 50px"|Votes
! style="width: 40px"|%
! style="width: 40px"|+/−%
|-

South of Scotland 

|-
! colspan=2 style="width: 200px"|Constituency
! style="width: 150px"|Elected member
! style="width: 300px"|Result

|-
! colspan="2" style="width: 150px"|Party
! Elected candidates
! style="width: 40px"|Seats
! style="width: 40px"|+/−
! style="width: 50px"|Votes
! style="width: 40px"|%
! style="width: 40px"|+/−%
|-

West of Scotland 

|-
! colspan=2 style="width: 200px"|Constituency
! style="width: 150px"|Elected member
! style="width: 300px"|Result

|-
! colspan="2" style="width: 150px"|Party
! Elected candidates
! style="width: 40px"|Seats
! style="width: 40px"|+/−
! style="width: 50px"|Votes
! style="width: 40px"|%
! style="width: 40px"|+/−%
|-

Party representation
Labour – 56 Members of the Scottish Parliament (MSPs)
SNP – 35 MSPs
Conservative – 18 MSPs
Liberal Democrats – 17 MSPs
Green – 1 MSP
SSP – 1 MSP
Others (Dennis Canavan, Falkirk West) – 1 MSP

Party leaders in 1999

 Labour – Donald Dewar
 SNP – Alex Salmond
 Conservative – David McLetchie
 Liberal Democrat – Jim Wallace
 SSP – Tommy Sheridan
 Green – Robin Harper

Opinion polls

See also
 Executive of the 1st Scottish Parliament
 Members elected to the 1st Scottish Parliament

Notes

References

External links
SourceForge.net

Manifestos
 Scotland First, Scottish Conservatives
 Caring for Scotland, Scottish Greens
 Raising the Standard, Scottish Liberal Democrats
 Scotland's Party, Scottish National Party

1999
Scottish Parliament election
Parliament election
1990s elections in Scotland
Scottish Parliament election